Pinkicha Vijay Aso! is an Indian Marathi language television series airing on Star Pravah. It starred Sharayu Sonawane and Vijay Andalkar in lead roles. It is produced by Mahesh Kothare and Adinath Kothare under Kothare Vision. It is a remake of Hindi TV series Nimki Mukhiya which aired on Star Bharat.

Plot 
A bit quirky, a bit naive but extremely smart, Pinky becomes the first female Sarpanch of her village. How will she survive the toxic politics surrounding her?

Mahaepisode (1 hour) 
 6 March 2022
 14 August 2022
 27 November 2022
 8 January 2023

Cast 
 Sharayu Sonawane as Pinki
 Vijay Andalkar as Yuvraj
 Rohini Naik as Shilpi
 Asha Shelar
 Sunil Tawade
 Atul Kaswa
 Adhokshaj Karhade
 Harshad Naybal
 Sarika Salunkhe
 Piyush Ranade
 Amita Khopkar
 Shantanu Gangane
 Ankita Joshi
 Swapnil Ajgaonkar
 Divesh Medge
 Saisha Salvi

References

External links 
 Pinkicha Vijay Aso! at Disney+ Hotstar
 
Marathi-language television shows
2022 Indian television series debuts
Star Pravah original programming